Route 413 is a highway on the Baie Verte Peninsula of Newfoundland in the Canadian province of Newfoundland and Labrador.  It is a short route, running from a junction at Route 410 (Dorset Trail) and ending at its eastern terminus at Middle Arm.

Route description

Route 413 begins at an intersection with Route 410 south of Baie Verte and it heads east through rural wooded areas for several kilometres. It passes through Burlington, where it has an intersection with a local road leading to Smith's Harbour, before winding its way south along the coastline of Notre Dame Bay to enter Middle Arm, where it comes to an end at an intersection with Main Street in downtown.

Major intersections

References

413